Twist n' Shout is a steel looping roller coaster located at Loudoun Castle Theme Park in Galston, south-west Scotland.

It opened in 2003 as a part of the new rides line-up brought in by new owner Henk Bembom. Twist n' Shout remained one of the most popular rides in the park until its closure in 2010. For the 2007 season, the trains were given a "mine train" theme.

The ride was previously located at Camelot Theme Park and Dreamland Margate, both of whom rented it from Loudoun Castle's owner. The ride was designed by Anton Schwarzkopf as one of his Silverarrow model looping coasters. Only three of these were ever built: Twist n' Shout, Scorpion at Busch Gardens Tampa Bay in America, and the other is said to be in a travelling funfair in Africa.

After the 2010 season, Twist n' Shout closed with the park. It is currently standing but not operating, and is listed for sale through amusement ride reseller Ital International.

Layout and model information
Twist n' Shout has a fairly simple and twisted layout involving a single vertical loop as the signature element. After the train is carried 60 feet into the air, riders twist down a drop and pass through the single vertical loop element. Following the loop, the train goes through a pretzel turnaround and threads the vertical loop. The train circles around a 900° helix and enters the brake run.

Twist n' Shout is one of only 3 remaining Silver Arrow Coasters designed by Anton Schwarzkopf – the other two being Scorpion at Busch Gardens Tampa, and Looping Star which is part of a travelling funfair called "Magic World" in Africa.

References

External links
 Twist N’ Shout at RCDB.com
 Photos of Twist n' Shout at Loudoun Castle Vaults

Roller coasters in the United Kingdom
Tourist attractions in East Ayrshire